Mirza Khan (15 December 1924 – 26 January 2022) was a Pakistani hurdler who competed in the 1952 Summer Olympics. He died on 25 January 2022, at the age of 97.

References

External links
 

1924 births
2022 deaths
Pakistani male hurdlers
Olympic athletes of Pakistan
Athletes (track and field) at the 1952 Summer Olympics
Asian Games gold medalists for Pakistan
Asian Games medalists in athletics (track and field)
Athletes (track and field) at the 1954 Asian Games
Medalists at the 1954 Asian Games
Commonwealth Games competitors for Pakistan
Athletes (track and field) at the 1954 British Empire and Commonwealth Games